HNLMS Johan Maurits van Nassau, named after John Maurice of Nassau, was a Dutch gunboat that served in the early part of World War II, when it was sunk. She was the sole ship of her class, which was developed from the earlier .

Service history
When the war broke out, Johan Maurits van Nassau was in the West Indies due to be relieved by the new gunnery training ship , allowing Johan Maurits van Nassau to return to the Netherlands. On 10 May 1940, the day the Germans launched their blitzkrieg, she was stationed as a search and guard vessel at Vlissingen, where she immediately was targeted by German aircraft, of which she shot down one. She remained in the area for a couple of days and was then ordered to bombard the Dutch aerodrome at Waalhaven in Rotterdam, which had been occupied by German paratroopers. She arrived in Hook of Holland, but after the loss of the destroyer Van Galen during her attempt to do the same, the operation—of which Flores was also part—was cancelled.

As part of the Battle of the Afsluitdijk, Johan Maurits van Nassau was ordered by Den Helder on 12 May 1940 to silence a German battery near the Afsluitdijk, and on 14 May, she bombarded the German battery (consisting of  guns of the 1. Her advanced fire control system enabled great accuracy. Despite fierce retaliation by German aircraft, she remained undamaged, to the great surprise of all.

The war in the Netherlands was, however, coming to an end, and the independent role of the Dutch Navy was over. Johan Maurits van Nassau—the largest vessel in the convoy—was the main target. Johan Maurits van Nassau received two or three hits, one of which caused a fire near an ammunition stack. The crew were ordered to abandon ship: 17 crewmen were killed. Later, most surviving crewmembers were transported back to Den Helder by the rescue ship Dorus Rijkers, but some continued to England aboard the remaining ships.

External links
U-boat.net
Detailed history of Johan Maurits van Nassau
Detailed history of Johan Maurits van Nassau

Ships built in Vlissingen
World War II sloops of the Netherlands
World War II shipwrecks in the North Sea
1932 ships
Maritime incidents in May 1940
Ships sunk by German aircraft
Gunboats sunk by aircraft
Ships built by Koninklijke Maatschappij De Schelde